The Goree Institute, formally The Goree Institute, Centre for Democracy, Development and Culture in Africa, is a Pan African organization located on Gorée Island in Dakar, Senegal. Its mission is "to contribute to the establishment of peaceful societies, fair and self-sufficient in Africa, to strengthen the political dialogue for the peaceful resolution of conflicts, contribute to the consolidation of democratic processes and institutions, and to encourage artistic creativity, social and economic" throughout Africa.

The institute, born from an idea formulated by Senegalese president Abdou Diouf, was founded June 25, 1992. It was established in the wake of a historic June 1987 meeting in Dakar, between the exiled leadership of the African National Congress and a group of liberal South Africans, mostly Afrikaners, from the business world, civil society, politics, religion and academia. Subsequently known as "the Dakar meeting," the gathering was one of many that opened the way for a negotiated end to apartheid in South Africa.

The constitutional and legal environment within which the Institute has since then operated was made possible by the formal statute granted by the government of Senegal in 1991, as an expression of its commitment to allow Goree Institute to work in the challenging but free-minded "democratic space" of an off-shore Pan-African public interest organisation.

Alongside its activities of research, training and facilitation, the centre has set up a section exclusively tasked with the responsibility of hosting summits, researches and artists that in their work contributes to the general mission of the institute. This section, The Teral, provides conferences and sabbatical facilities on Gorée.

The Executive Director is Doudou Dia, and Ayo Obe is chairperson of the Board of Trustees.

External links
 Official web site

History of the African National Congress
Pan-Africanist organizations in Africa
Organisations based in Senegal
Reconciliation